Kelcie Herron Banks (born May 8, 1965) is an American former professional boxer. As an amateur, he won the gold medal at the 1986 World Championships in Reno and at the 1987 Pan American Games in Indianapolis. Inducted to the USA Boxing Hall of Fame in 1993. He represented his native country at the 1988 Summer Olympics in Seoul, South Korea, where he was surprisingly knocked out cold in the first round by the Netherlands' Regilio Tuur.

Amateur highlights
 Claimed a record of 460-86
 1986 United States Amateur Featherweight champion
 1986 World Amateur Featherweight champion
 1987 United States Amateur Featherweight champion
 1987 Gold Medalist at Pan-American Games in Indianapolis as a Featherweight
 Qualified for the United States Olympic Team as a Featherweight. Defeated Jesse James Leija and Eddie Hopson to earn a berth
 Was knocked out in the 1st round of opening round match, by Regilio Tuur (Netherlands).
Banks had an amateur record of reportedly 500+ fights by 1985 already.

1988 Olympic results
Below is the record of Kelcie Banks, an American featherweight boxer who competed at the 1988 Seoul Olympics:

 Round of 64: lost to Regilio Tuur (Netherlands) by first-round knockout

Professional career
In his professional career Banks retired in 1997, with a record of 22 wins (11 knockouts), six losses and two draws.  Banks tried to return to boxing in 2002, but a license was denied by the Nevada State Athletic Commission.

References

External links
 

1965 births
Living people
Boxers from Chicago
Featherweight boxers
Lightweight boxers
Southpaw boxers
Boxers at the 1987 Pan American Games
Boxers at the 1988 Summer Olympics
Olympic boxers of the United States
Pan American Games gold medalists for the United States
American male boxers
African-American boxers
AIBA World Boxing Championships medalists
Pan American Games medalists in boxing
Medalists at the 1987 Pan American Games